Hila Oren is an Israeli manager and entrepreneur, CEO of Tel Aviv Foundation.

Biography
Oren founded her first business, Hofesh, and was its CEO at the age of twenty five. Later, she established the municipal culture company, Shoham, and served as the director of tourism operations of the Society for the Protection of Nature in Israel.

From 2008 to 2010, she was the general director of Tel Aviv centennial administration, where she administered Tel Aviv Centennial 
program. 

In 2011, she established and served as the CEO of Tel Aviv Global, 

a city-subsidiary company, branding

Tel Aviv as an hub of innovation, 

high-tech center and tourists destination.

During her tenure, Tel Aviv named the “world’s smartest city” in The Smart City Expo, Barcelona, 2014. 

In 2016, Oren was appointed as the CEO of Tel Aviv Foundation,

a partnership with worldwide donors (among them Bloomberg Philanthropies, Rockefeller Foundation and the Bernard Van Leer Foundation) that raised 550 million dollars and founded 600 projects, since its inception in 1977.  The donations are matched by Tel Aviv 
municipality. 

She sits on the boards of Vertigo Dance Troupe, Neot Kedumim Park and Port of Haifa. Previously, she sat on the board of Amidor 
housing company. Oren has a BA and MBA from Tel Aviv University. 

She received her doctorate from University of Haifa in 2019, with the topic of her thesis being the global branding of Tel Aviv. 

She is a graduate of the Harvard Kennedy School.

In 2018 she became the first thinker in residence of Christchurch foundation in Christchurch, New Zealand. 

Currently, Oren gives workshops and lectures about smart cities worldwide. 

She is also an adjunct professor of International and public affairs at the school for international and public affairs, Columbia University.

References

Israeli women chief executive officers
Tel Aviv University alumni
University of Haifa alumni
Tel Aviv
Living people
Year of birth missing (living people)